The 2018 Moldovan National Division was the 28th season of top-tier football in Moldova. The season started on 1 April 2018 and ended on 24 November 2018. Fixtures were announced on 19 March 2018. Sheriff Tiraspol were the defending champions. The winners of the league this season earned a spot in the first qualifying round of the 2019–20 UEFA Champions League, and the second, third and fourth placed clubs earned a place in the first qualifying round of the 2019–20 UEFA Europa League.

Teams

Number of teams by region

Stadia and locations

Personnel and kits

Managerial changes

League table

Results
Matches 1−14
Teams will play each other twice (once home, once away).

Matches 15−28
Teams will play each other twice (once home, once away).

Results by round
The following table represents the teams game results in each round.

Top goalscorers

Hat-tricks

Top assists

Clean sheets

Attendances

Notes

References

External links
 Official website
 uefa.com

National Division 2018
Moldovan Super Liga seasons
Moldova 1